The Green Stripe (La Raie Verte), also known as Portrait of Madame Matisse. The Green Line, is a portrait by Henri Matisse of his wife, Amélie Noellie Matisse-Parayre. It is an oil painting on canvas, completed autumn or winter 1905. It is named for the green band that divides the face in half, by which Matisse sought to produce a sense of light, shadow, and volume without using traditional shading. Matisse's colorism was shocking at the time. When the painting was exhibited in Paris in 1906 such works were being derisively labeled as the creations of Les Fauves (the wild beasts), along with similar works of André Derain and Maurice de Vlaminck.

Both admirers and critics of Matisse have characterized The Green Stripe as a disturbing image: a friend of the painting's owners Michael and Sarah Stein called it "a demented caricature of a portrait", and in 1910 the critic Gelett Burgess wrote that The Green Stripe was Matisse's "punishment" of Amélie that compelled the viewer "to see in her a strange and terrible aspect." The art historian John Klein has suggested that difficulties in the Matisses' marriage may have contributed to the portrait's impersonal and mask-like character.

The painting is in Statens Museum for Kunst in Copenhagen, Denmark.

References

Paintings by Henri Matisse
Post-impressionist paintings
1905 paintings
Paintings in the collection of the National Gallery of Denmark
20th-century paintings in Denmark
Portraits of women
Fauvism